Niccolò Tornioli was an Italian painter. He was born in Siena in 1598 and was in Rome from 1633.

In the 1640s he worked for Cardinal Bernardino Spada and his brother Virgilio Spada. Most of his preserved paintings are today in Galleria Spada in Rome.

He painted for the Spada Chapel in the church of San Paolo in Bologna a Cain Slaying Abel and a Jacob Wrestling with the Angel.

References 
 

People from Siena
17th-century Italian painters
Italian male painters
Painters from Tuscany
Painters from Bologna
Italian Baroque painters
Year of death unknown
Year of birth unknown